Juriens de la Gravière usually refers to a French family of magistrates originating in Riom, Auvergne.

 People
 Lt. Gen. Guillaume Jurien de la Gravière (1738–1809)
 Charles-Marie Jurien de la Gravière (1763–1836)
 Admiral Pierre Roch Jurien de La Gravière (1772–1849)
 Anne-Blanche Jurien (1773–1840)
 Louis Charles Jurien de la Gravière (1797–1858)
 Admiral Edmond Jurien de La Gravière (1812–1892)

 Namesake ships

 French cruiser Jurien de la Gravière, a French Navy protected cruiser during World War I
 French destroyer Jurien de la Gravière, the former Italian Soldati-class destroyer Mitragliere, transferred to the French Navy as war reparations after World War II

 Namesake places

 Jurien Bay, Western Australia, named for Charles-Marie Jurien de la Gravière (1763–1836)

French families